Xu Aihui (born 25 April 1978 in Heilongjiang) is a Chinese race walker.

She finished thirteenth at the 2003 World Championships and eleventh at the 2004 World Race Walking Cup, the latter in a personal best time of 1:29:30 hours.

Achievements

External links

1978 births
Living people
Chinese female racewalkers
Athletes from Heilongjiang